The Coalition on the Public Understanding of Science (COPUS) is a United States grassroots effort linking universities, scientific societies, science advocacy groups, science media, science educators, businesses, and industry in a consortium having as its goal a greater public understanding of the nature of science and its value to society. Its premise is that full public engagement in science is critical to the long-term social well-being of the American people.

COPUS is organizing the Year of Science 2009, in cooperation with the National Academy of Sciences.

COPUS is sponsored by the American Institute of Biological Sciences and the Geological Society of America.

The COPUS national office is located in Washington, D.C., hosted by the American Institute of Biological Sciences (AIBS). 

Participants in the COPUS network, as of March 19, 2007 include:
Alaska Division of Geological & Geophysical Surveys
Alliance for Science
American Association of Physics Teachers
American Fisheries Society
American Institute of Biological Sciences
American Society of Human Genetics
American Society of Plant Biologists
American Sociological Association
Arizona Geological Survey
Arkansas State University
Berkeley Natural History Museums
BioOne
Biotechnology Institute
Botanical Society of America
Colorado Science Forum
Denver Museum of Nature and Science
Geological Society of America
HMS Beagle Project
Louisiana State University Museum of Natural Science
Lyme Regis Fossil Festival - Rising Seas
Massachusetts Society for Medical Research
National Academy of Sciences
National Center for Ecological Analysis and Synthesis
National Institute of General Medical Sciences
National Institutes of Health
National Science Teachers Association
New York State Museum
Peabody Museum of Natural History at Yale University
Pinellas County Environmental Management
Science Education Solutions
Society for Developmental Biology
University of California Museum of Paleontology
University of California Press
University of Connecticut
Visionlearning
Wonderfest

External links
 COPUS

Scientific organizations based in the United States